Mineral Hill is a round-topped hill,  high, with ice-free, talus-covered slopes, standing  west of Trepassey Bay on Tabarin Peninsula, Antarctica. It was probably first seen by the Swedish Antarctic Expedition under Otto Nordenskiöld, 1901–04. The hill was first charted by the Falkland Islands Dependencies Survey in 1946, who so named it because small quantities of reddish mineral in the rock gave the surfaces a conspicuous color.

See also
Fivemile Rock

References

Hills of Trinity Peninsula